Ripley Eagles Rand is an American attorney who served as the United States Attorney for the Middle District of North Carolina from 2011 to 2017. President Barack Obama nominated him to the post on July 28, 2010.

Education 
Rand earned both Bachelor of Arts and a Juris Doctor from the University of North Carolina at Chapel Hill. He co-wrote a children's book entitled I Want to Go to UNC!

Career 
Prior to serving as United States Attorney, Rand was a Wake County Superior Court judge.

Rand resigned from his role as United States Attorney one week before the inauguration of Donald Trump. Rand is now a partner and criminal defense attorney at Womble Bond Dickinson in Raleigh, North Carolina.

Personal life 
Rand is the son of two-time state Senator Tony Rand.

References

WRAL: Rand named new U.S. attorney for central N.C.

United States Attorneys for the Middle District of North Carolina
North Carolina state court judges
Living people
1967 births
University of North Carolina School of Law alumni